Locust is a kit car inspired by the Lotus Seven. It was first developed in the mid 1980s as a cheap kit car to be built onto the chassis of a Triumph Spitfire, it was later developed into a full kit car which used its own fully designed ladder chassis - unlike others using space frame. The car was famed for its cheap to build construction using MDF in the body, the last kits were produced in early 2000.

History 
The original Locust kit was based on the Triumph Spitfire or Herald chassis to give the finished vehicle the look of a Lotus 7, this was quickly superseded by a all new Locust using its own developed chassis with the choice of using a Triumph Spitfire or MK1/MK2 Ford Escort for the donor vehicle parts to complete the car. The original design was by John Cowperthwaite and it was sold as the JC Locust by J.C. Auto Patterns.
The Locust used a ladder frame and a body constructed from three 8 ft by 4 ft sheets of 3/4" thick exterior grade or marine plywood alternatively MDF sheets. Once complete, the body tub is skinned with aluminium sheet.

Later vehicles were sold by T&J Sportscars who also introduced a larger Locust to compete with the Robin Hood kit car, this vehicle was Ford Cortina-based called the Hornet. 

In 1995 the escort based Locust was taken over by White Rose Vehicles (WRV) who continued to sell the same model until 1998, seeing that mk1 and mk2 Ford escorts were becoming rare they developed and introduced the new Ford Sierra-based Locust SIII. The series 3 used a new ladder chassis with the Ford Sierra rear diff and could be built with Pinto or Zetec engines.

White Rose Vehicles closed in April 2000 so the escort based Locust classic was taken over by BWE Sportcars who also made the Hornet and the Grasshopper electric car for children. The Sierra-based Series III was taken over by Road Tech Engineering which was renamed to the RT Blaze, this company closed in 2006 but only sold 15 kits. Bev Evans of BWE died on 10 April 2014. BWE Sportscars is no longer trading.

Models 

"The Locust" - Early vehicles based on Triumph Spitfire or Herald

"The New Locust" - Using its own chassis with either Triumph or Ford Escort mechanicals

"Locust classic" - Slightly designed, now using only Ford Escort mechanicals with Ford Cortina front subframe

"Locust Hornet" - Later just called the Hornet, same construction as the classic Locust but based all around the Cortina for a bigger vehicle

"Locust S111" - The Locust for the new millennium, using more modern ford mechanicals

References

Further reading

External links 

 Locust Information

Companies based in Barnsley
Lotus Seven replicas
Sports cars